Sieradzans is an ethnographic group of Polish people that originate from the historical region of Sieradz Land, located within borders of the Łódź Voivodeship, Poland. The group does not express much cultural separateness from other Poles. Historically, the group has been heavily inflected by the neighboring groups of Silesians, Greater Poland people, and Lesser Poland People.

Notes

References 

Polish people
Ethnic groups in Poland
Łódź Voivodeship
Lechites
Slavic ethnic groups
Sieradz County